Volver a vivir may refer to:

 Volver a vivir (film), a 1941 Argentine film
 Volver a vivir (telenovela), a 1996 Venezuelan telenovela